I Am an Impure Thinker  is a book by Eugen Rosenstock-Huessy (1888-1973), German social philosopher and is an English-language introduction to Rosenstock-Huessy’s German-language book, Soziologie. It is a collection of essays, which represents an accessible introduction to Rosenstock-Huessy’s thought. The "impure thinker" title reflects the author’s escape from the bounds set by academic tradition, his belief that thought must be accompanied by passionate convictions and engagement, and that sterile intellect is a disease. While apparently unrelated, the essays nevertheless have an underlying unity, which runs through his discussion of the concepts of William James, the Gospels, the Egyptian symbol of Ka, and other uncommon sources. Together the essays contribute to the discovery of a post-theological language. They answer Dietrich Bonhoeffer’s question: “How can we speak of God to modern man who ‘has come of age?’”
It has been recognized as a summary of Rosenstock-Huessy's insights into Western culture by such thinkers as W. H. Auden, Dietrich Bonhoeffer, Martin E. Marty, and Harold J. Berman.

Overview
Rosenstock-Huessy's collection of essays summarize themes and major methodological concerns from his work and provide autobiographical material. In the opening chapter, Farewell to Descartes, he writes:

The emphasis upon his impurity is, in large part, one further missive directed at the claims of philosophers who wish, through reason, to achieve truth in its purity. We are, for Rosenstock-Huessy, always caught up in the stresses and strains and impurities of the world and we have a much better chance of improving our condition if we accept this reality and get on with it.

In the foreword of the book, W. H. Auden writes:

That summarizes of Rosenstock-Huessy's procedure, which combines the personal and the socio-historical.

Assessment of Speech and Reality
In the foreword of the book, W. H. Auden writes:

Eberhardt Bethge wrote of the author:

In his book, By Way of Response, Martin E. Marty writes:

In his book, Law and Revolution: The Formation of the Western Legal Tradition, Harold J. Berman cites I am an Impure Thinker as contributing to the insights on the discussion of law and revolution.

References

External links 
 The official web site of the Eugen Rosenstock-Huessy Fund and Argo Books includes a biography, accessed 20 March 2007
 The Norwich Center, Norwich, Vermont, maintains an internet site devoted to an introductory biography and appreciation of Eugen Rosenstock-Huessy, signed by Clinton C. Gardner, President of the Norwich Center, accessed 20 March 2007
Eugen Rosenstock-Huessy Gesellschaft

1970 non-fiction books
Sociology books